The State of Maryland contains  of designated state forest which are managed by the Maryland Forest Service.

The following is a list of Maryland state forests.

Maryland State Forests

Maryland Demonstration Forests

Maryland Forest Lands

 Chesapeake Forest Lands

See also
List of U.S. National Forests
List of Maryland wildlife management areas

References

External links
 
 Maryland's State Forests at Maryland Department of Natural Resources Forest Service

Maryland